Logan Ferland (born April 14, 1997) is a Canadian football left tackle for the Saskatchewan Roughriders of the Canadian Football League (CFL). He previously spent five seasons with the Regina Thunder of the Canadian Junior Football League (CJFL) from 2015–2019.

Early life and education
Logan Ferland was born on April 14, 1997, in Melfort, Saskatchewan. He went to high school at Melfort and Unit Comprehensive Collegiate. He chose not to go to a university and instead played in the Canadian Junior Football League for the Regina Thunder. He spent four seasons with them (2015–2018) before being signed into the Canadian Football League. While on the Saskatchewan Roughriders' practice squad in 2019, he returned to the Thunder and won the Prairie Football Conference Outstanding Offensive Lineman award. He was named All-Star each year from 2016 to 2019.

Professional career
He was signed by the Saskatchewan Roughriders of the Canadian Football League (CFL) in 2019. He spent the season on the practice squad and returned to the CJFL.

References

External links
Saskatchewan Roughriders bio

1997 births
Living people
Players of Canadian football from Saskatchewan
People from Melfort, Saskatchewan
Canadian football offensive linemen
Saskatchewan Roughriders players